Walsdorf refers to the following places in Germany:

 Walsdorf, Bavaria
 Walsdorf, Hesse, is now part of Idstein
 Walsdorf, Rhineland-Palatinate